Shine is the second studio album by Crime & the City Solution, released on April 25, 1988 through Mute Records.

Accolades

Track listing

Personnel 
Crime & the City Solution
Bronwyn Adams – violin
Simon Bonney – vocals
Chrislo Haas – guitar, keyboards
Alexander Hacke – guitar
Mick Harvey – drums, piano
Thomas Stern – bass guitar
Production and additional personnel
Tony Cohen – engineering
Peter Gruchot – photography

References

External links 
 

1988 albums
Crime & the City Solution albums
Albums produced by Tony Cohen
Mute Records albums